Ahmede Hussain (born 16 July 1978) is a Bangladeshi writer. 

His ancestors hail from the former Portuguese enclave of Patherghata, Chittagong in Bangladesh. He was the Literary Editor of The Daily Star (Bangladesh). 
He edited The New Anthem: The Subcontinent in its Own Words, an anthology of fiction from the Indian subcontinent. The book has been greeted with acclaim: "The richness is all, both in terms of the writers brought together and in the quality of the tales that come to you one after the other."

As of May 2019, he is working on his first novel. He is also a senior journalist. He was never an in-charge of The Daily Star (Bangladesh)'s weekly supplement The Star (Bangladesh).

Works
 
 Blues for Allah, Published from Monash University 
 The Journal of Contemporary Literature, an Indian journal, has published Ahmede Hussain and Tabish Khair's conversations on literature, politics and the world today in its Volume 1, No 1 issue.

References

1978 births
Living people
Bangladeshi male writers
Writers from Dhaka
People from Chittagong